WBGW (1330 AM) is a radio station broadcasting a Christian radio format. Licensed to Evansville, Indiana, United States, the station serves the Evansville area.  The station is currently owned by Music Ministries Inc. and features programming from Moody Broadcasting.

History
The station went on the air as WJPS on 1948-10-30. The station changed its call sign to WKKR on 1982-04-01. On 1983-04-21, the station changed its call sign to WVHI. On November 23, 2016, it changed its call sign to the current WBGW.

References

External links
FCC History Cards for WBGW 

BGW (AM)